Sosigenes may refer to:

People
Sosigenes (astronomer), the astronomer consulted by Julius Caesar for the design of the Julian calendar
Sosigenes the Peripatetic, a philosopher living at the end of the 2nd century and tutor of Alexander of Aphrodisias
Sosigenes (Stoic), an ancient Greek philosopher

Other uses
Sosigenes (crater), on the moon